Qualicum Bay is a settlement in British Columbia and is served by the coast-spanning Island Highway and the Island Rail Corridor.

Climate

See also 
List of communities in British Columbia
Qualicum Beach

References 

Designated places in British Columbia
Settlements in British Columbia